This is a list of Hanoverian princesses by marriage from the accession of George III to the throne of the Kingdom of Hanover in 1814.

List of princesses by marriage since 1814

References